This article lists important figures and events in the public affairs of British Malaya during the year 1930, together with births and deaths of prominent Malayans.

Incumbent political figures

Central level 
 Governor of Federated of Malay States :
 Hugh Clifford (until 5 February)
 Cecil Clementi (from 5 February)
 Chief Secretaries to the Government of the FMS :
 Sir William Peel (until unknown date) 
 Charles Walter Hamilton Cochrane (from unknown date) 
 Governor of Straits Settlements :
 Hugh Clifford (until 20 October)
 Cecil Clementi (from 5 February)

State level 
  Perlis :
 Raja of Perlis : Syed Alwi Syed Saffi Jamalullail
  Johore :
 Sultan of Johor : Sultan Ibrahim Al-Masyhur
  Kedah :
 Sultan of Kedah : Abdul Hamid Halim Shah
  Kelantan :
 Sultan of Kelantan : Sultan Ismail Sultan Muhammad IV
  Trengganu :
 Sultan of Trengganu : Sulaiman Badrul Alam Shah
  Selangor :
 British Residents of Selangor : James Lornie 
 Sultan of Selangor : Sultan Sir Alaeddin Sulaiman Shah
  Penang :
 Monarchs : King George V
 Residents-Councillors :
 Captain Meadows Frost (until unknown date) 
 Edward Wilmot Francis Gilman (from unknown date) 
  Malacca :
 Monarchs : King George V
 Residents-Councillors :
  Negri Sembilan :
 British Residents of Negri Sembilan : James William Simmons
 Yang di-Pertuan Besar of Negri Sembilan : Tuanku Muhammad Shah ibni Almarhum Tuanku Antah 
   Pahang :
 British Residents of Pahang : C. F. J. Green
 Sultan of Pahang : Sultan Abdullah al-Mu'tassim Billah 
  Perak :
 British Residents of Perak : Charles Walter Hamilton Cochrane 
 Sultan of Perak : Sultan Iskandar Shah

Events 
 30 April – The Malayan Communist Party was founded and replaced South Seas Communist Party.
 Unknown date – The Lee Rubber Building was completed.

Births 
 15 April – Sakaran Dandai – 8th Yang di-Pertua Negeri of Sabah (1995-2002)
 29 April – Sultan Mahmud Al-Muktafi Billah Shah – 16th Sultan of Terengganu (died 1998)
 29 May – Choong Ewe Beng – Badminton player (died 2013)
 24 August – Sidique Ali Merican, sprinter and sports administrator (died 2009)
 24 October – Sultan Ahmad Shah Al-Musta’in Billah ibni Almarhum Sultan Abu Bakar – 5th Sultan of Pahang
 Unknown date – A. Rahim – Actor (died 1992)
 Unknown date – A. Wahid – Actor
 Unknown date – Ghazali Sumantri – Actor (died 2001)
 Unknown date – Kamaruddin bin Mohd Isa – Politician (died 1989)
 Unknown date – Sultan Mahmud Al-Muktafi Billah Shah – 16th Sultan of Terengganu (died 1998)

Deaths 
 10 September – Abdul Rahman Andak – 1st State Secretary of Johor (1894-1909)

See also 
 1930
 1929 in Malaya
 1931 in Malaya
 History of Malaysia

References 

1930s in British Malaya
Malaya